Roland Fidel (born 8 February 1935) is a Swiss weightlifter. He competed in the men's light heavyweight event at the 1960 Summer Olympics.

References

External links
 

1935 births
Living people
Swiss male weightlifters
Olympic weightlifters of Switzerland
Weightlifters at the 1960 Summer Olympics
People from Le Locle
Sportspeople from the canton of Neuchâtel